Marcus, Markus, Márkus or Mărcuș may refer to:

 Marcus (name), a masculine given name
 Marcus (praenomen), a Roman personal name

Places
 Marcus, a main belt asteroid, also known as (369088) Marcus 2008 GG44
 Mărcuş, a village in Dobârlău Commune, Covasna County, Romania
 Marcus, Illinois, an unincorporated community, United States
 Marcus, Iowa, a city, United States
 Marcus, South Dakota, an unincorporated community, United States
 Marcus, Washington, a town, United States
 Marcus Island, Japan, also known as Minami-Tori-shima
 Mărcuș River, Romania
 Marcus Township, Cherokee County, Iowa, United States

Other uses
 Markus, a beetle genus in family Cantharidae
 Marcus (album), 2008 album by Marcus Miller
 Marcus (comedian), finalist on Last Comic Standing season 6
 Marcus Amphitheater, Milwaukee, Wisconsin
 Marcus Center, Milwaukee, Wisconsin
 Marcus & Co., American jewelry retailer
 Marcus by Goldman Sachs, an online bank
 USS Marcus (DD-321), a US Navy destroyer (1919-1935)

See also
 Marcos (disambiguation)
 Marques (disambiguation)
 Neiman Marcus, American retail department store